The Zhi Qu (Tibetan) or Tongtian River is a  long river in Qinghai Province, northwest China. It begins at the confluence of Tuotuo River and Dangqu River, before flowing southeast and meeting the Jinsha River near the border of Qinghai and Sichuan. It is within the Yangtze River drainage basin.

Name
The Chinese name comes from a fabled river in the Journey to the West.  In antiquity, it was called the Yak River. In Mongolian, this section is known as the Murui-ussu (lit. "Winding Stream") and is sometimes confused with the nearby Baishui.

Geography
The three principal headwaters—the Chumaer, Muluwusu, and Akedamu rivers—join to form the Tongtian River, which flows southeast to Zhimenda near the frontier between Qinghai and Sichuan provinces, where it becomes the Jinsha River (Jinsha Jiang). The Jinsha River is a primary tributary of the Yangtze River (Chang Jiang).

The Tongtian River is one of the five large rivers flowing from headwaters on the Qinghai-Tibet Plateau. Its length is 1,012  kilometres, draining an area of  138,000 square kilometres. Pilgrims go to the river because it is mythical, but also it is known for its "sutra bridge" and "Gyiana Mani stones".

Dams
The Tongtian is planned for heavy development, primarily for hydroelectric power. As of March 2014 a total of 10 dams are planned for the river. Those dams are listed below from downstream to upstream.
Sewu Dam – Planned, 176.8 MW
Xirong Dam – Planned, 160.5 MW
Cefang Dam – Planned, 158 MW
Genzhe Dam – Planned, 612 MW
Leyi Dam – Planned, 112.8 MW
Dequkou Dam – Planned, 276.5 MW
Ruoqin Dam – Planned, 200 MW
Lumari Dam – Planned, 72 MW
Yage Dam – Planned, 63.6 MW
Marigei Dam – Planned, 10.4 MW

See also
Index: Tributaries of the Yangtze River
List of rivers in China

References

External links
A Visit to Gyigu by the Tongtian River
Photo of bridge over the Tongtain River

Rivers of Qinghai
Jinsha River
Tributaries of the Yangtze River